Between 1975 and 1989 the England cricket team represented England, Scotland and Wales in Test cricket. During that time England played 152 Test matches, resulting in 40 victories, 62 draws and 50 defeats. They faced Sri Lanka for the first time in Test cricket when England toured the country in 1981–82. England did not face South Africa during this period, due to the sporting boycott of South Africa during the apartheid era. The West Indies were the most successful team in Test cricket at the time, and were described as "the undisputed champions" by Tony Becca of ESPNcricinfo; England faced them in 29 Test matches, and did not beat them. England, like many other Test teams, lost some of their best players to World Series Cricket, an unsanctioned competition organised by Kerry Packer. Among those players who signed up for the league, and were subsequently banned from Test cricket, was England's captain, Tony Greig.

England faced Australia most frequently during this period—playing 52 matches against them—followed by the West Indies. England won more matches than they lost against Australia, India, New Zealand and Sri Lanka. Against Pakistan they won four and lost four, while against the West Indies they lost 20 of their 29 fixtures. England won 11 matches by an innings, with their largest victory being by an innings and 120 runs against Pakistan in 1978. Their largest victory by runs alone during this period was in the 1978–79 Ashes series, when they beat Australia by 205 runs in the fifth Test, while they won by ten wickets twice. Conversely, England suffered their second-largest ever defeat by runs alone, losing to the West Indies by 425 runs during their visit in 1976.

Key

Matches

Summary

Notes

References

England in international cricket
England Test
Test